David Dowlen (born February 8, 1960) is an American former professional tennis player.

Dowlen won the USTA National Boys 18 Championship in 1978. After, he was a leading player on the University of Houston tennis team.

Dowlen enjoyed most of his tennis success while playing doubles. During his career, he won four doubles titles. He achieved a career-high doubles ranking of World No. 30 in 1984. He achieved much of his success alongside doubles partner Nduka Odizor, including beating John McEnroe.

Career finals

Doubles (4 wins, 3 losses)

External links
 
 

American male tennis players
Houston Cougars men's tennis players
Tennis players from Houston
Living people
1960 births